Geoglossum cookeanum is a mushroom in the family Geoglossaceae.

References

Geoglossaceae
Fungi of Europe